"Some Remarks on Logical Form" (1929) was the only academic paper ever published by Ludwig Wittgenstein, and contained Wittgenstein's thinking on logic and the philosophy of mathematics immediately before the rupture that divided the early Wittgenstein of the Tractatus Logico-Philosophicus from the late Wittgenstein. The approach to logical form in the paper reflected Frank P. Ramsey's critique of Wittgenstein's account of color in the Tractatus, and has been analyzed by G. E. M. Anscombe and Jaakko Hintikka, among others.

References

Ludwig Wittgenstein
Books by Ludwig Wittgenstein
Philosophy of mathematics literature
Logic literature